"Brooklyn Go Hard" is the second promo single by rap artist Jay-Z, featuring additional vocals by alternative musician Santigold. The song was produced by Kanye West. It appears on the soundtrack to The Notorious B.I.G. biopic Notorious for which it serves as the theme song. It was released on December 1, 2008, as an exclusive download available via subscription to (RED)Wire, with a portion of the profits going towards Bono's Product Red organization. In 2013, it was used in a trailer and several television commercials for the Jackie Robinson biopic 42: The True Story of an American Legend.

Santigold first hinted at a collaboration in an interview with NME, saying she "may also do something with Jay-Z, it's kind of secret – it's not for anything, it's just 'cause we want to." The collaboration contains a sample of Santigold's track "Shove It", in the same vein as Jay-Z and T.I.'s "Swagga Like Us", which samples M.I.A.'s "Paper Planes". However, in "Brooklyn Go Hard", Santigold provides another new verse.

Crooked I, Fabolous, Joell Ortiz, Royce da 5'9", Mos Def and Sauce Money have all created freestyle raps to the song, while Raekwon has created his own version titled "Staten Go Hard".

The official remix to the song features Santigold, Foxy Brown and Wayne Wonder.

Charts
"Brooklyn Go Hard" initially charted at number two on Billboard's Bubbling Under R&B/Hip-Hop Singles. The following week, it debuted on the Hot R&B/Hip-Hop Songs chart at number 62 and peaked at number 61 since then. "Brooklyn Go Hard" entered the Hot Rap Tracks chart at number 18.

References

2008 singles
2008 songs
Def Jam Recordings singles
Jay-Z songs
Roc-A-Fella Records singles
Santigold songs
Song recordings produced by Kanye West
Songs about New York City
Songs written by Jay-Z
Songs written by Kanye West
Songs written by Santigold